RAISE-2 (RApid Innovative payload demonstration SatellitE-2) is a smallsat for technology demonstration, part of the Japanese space agency JAXA's Innovative Satellite Technology Demonstration Program. RAISE-2 was launched on 9 November 2021 as the main satellite of Innovative Satellite Technology Demonstration-2. RAISE-2 was developed by Mitsubishi Electric.

Instruments 
RAISE-2 carries six payloads that will each be tested in orbit during its one year mission. The payloads were selected in December 2018.

 SPR was developed by Sony Semiconductor Solutions Corporation
 I-FOG (In-orbit Demonstration of Closed-Loop Fiber Optic Gyro) was developed by Tamagawa Seiki Company
 ASC was developed by Amanogi Corporation
 3D-ANT is a satellite antenna made by a 3D printer, it was developed by Mitsubishi Electric
 ATCD was developed by Tohoku University
 MARIN was developed by JAXA

See also 

 MDS-1

References 

Satellites of Japan
Spacecraft launched in 2021
2021 in Japan